Crataegus wattiana, the Altai hawthorn, is an Asian species of hawthorn. The original description states that it has yellow fruit with five stones (pyrenes). Crataegus wattiana var. wattiana has become naturalized in Seattle, in the U.S. state of Washington.

Two varieties are recognized in the 2015 Flora of North America:
 var. wattiana has shallow leaf lobes
 var. incisa C.K.Schneid. leaves are pinnate near the base, and lobed in the upper portion

See also 
 List of hawthorn species with yellow fruit

References

wattiana